The women's triple jump event at the 1999 European Athletics U23 Championships was held in Göteborg, Sweden, at Ullevi on 1 August 1999.

Medalists

Results

Final
1 August

Participation
According to an unofficial count, 14 athletes from 10 countries participated in the event.

 (1)
 (1)
 (2)
 (1)
 (3)
 (2)
 (1)
 (1)
 (1)
 (1)

References

Triple jump
Triple jump at the European Athletics U23 Championships